Not My Fault is a collaborative studio album by South Korean music producer Dress and singer-songwriter Sogumm. It was released on September 27, 2019 through Highline Entertainment. It was later nominated for Best R&B Album at the Korean Music Awards and peaked at number 65 on the Gaon Album Chart.

Background 
In an interview with Genie Music, Sogumm explained how the album was made.
Dress also made commercial music but wanted to express his feelings through beats without thinking too much. I worked with him because he requested a collaboration first, but I wrote songs quickly and he kept sending me beats. So we were planning to release one or two songs at first but made so many songs in an instant. The general public may find our music difficult but we were not asking for their understanding, so we named the album Not My Fault and decided on the album concept.

Music and lyrics 
Sogumm's vocals that pronounce words differently are sometimes innocent("I Wonder", "Honey Bee", "Pretty Bitch"), dry("Sorry", "Once Again"), or magical("Diary", "Dreamer, Doer"). Meanwhile, Dress' production encompasses hip hop, R&B, and electronica.

"Diary" is reminiscent of 90's trip hop sounds like those of Morcheeba. It tells the direction of the album with a down-tempo beat played with an analog drum set and piano, string, and guitar sounds distorted by an effects unit. "Sorry" emphasizes electronic sounds while "Pretty Bitch" solely features acoustic guitar sounds.

Critical reception 
Kang Il-gwon of Rhythmer rated the album 4 out of 5 stars and claimed that it was "electrifying, excellent, and fresh". On the other hand, he suggested that Sogumm write more lyrics in Korean.

Critics of Music Y rated "I Wonder" 3.5 out of 5 stars. According to Jeong Byeong-uk, Dress "knows how to use minimal sources in the right place and bring out the maximum amount of dreamlike atmosphere and groove." Also, Sogumm "pronounces lyrics uniquely while reducing the resonance of the sound and shows her individuality with unconventional breathing and accents." Meanwhile, Jay Park balances out the intenseness of the hook by singing sweet lyrics in a natural style.

Year-end lists

Awards and nominations

Track listing

Charts

References 

2019 albums
Electronica albums by South Korean artists
Rhythm and blues albums by South Korean artists